Line 6 is a line of the Xi'an Metro. The line is colored Pantone 2726C (blue) on maps.

History

Opening timeline

Stations

References 

06
Railway lines opened in 2020
2020 establishments in China